The Comparative Tracking Index (CTI) is used to measure the electrical breakdown (tracking) properties of an insulating material. Tracking is an electrical breakdown on the surface of an insulating material wherein an initial exposure to electrical arcing heat carbonizes the material.  The carbonized areas are more conductive than the pristine insulator, increasing current flow, resulting in increased heat generation, and eventually the insulation becomes completely conductive.

Details
A large voltage difference gradually creates a conductive leakage path across the surface of the material by forming a carbonized track. Testing method is specified in IEC standard 60112 and ASTM D3638.

To measure the tracking, 50 drops of 0.1% ammonium chloride solution are dropped on the material, and the voltage measured for a 3 mm thickness is considered representative of the material performance. Also term PTI (Proof Tracking Index) is used: it means voltage at which during testing on five samples the samples pass the test with no failures.

Performance Level Categories (PLC) were introduced to avoid excessive implied precision and bias.

The CTI value is used for electrical safety assessment of electrical apparatus, as for instance carried out by testing and certification laboratories. The minimum required creepage distances over an insulating material between electrically conducting parts in apparatus, especially between parts with a high voltage and parts that can be touched by human users, is dependent on the insulator's CTI value. Also for internal distances in an apparatus by maintaining CTI based distances, the risk of fire is reduced.

Creepage distance requirement depends on the CTI. Material which CTI is unknown are classified in IIIb group. There are no CTI requirement for glass, ceramic, and other inorganic material which do not breakdown on the surface.

The better the insulation, the higher the CTI (positive relationship). In terms of clearance, a higher CTI value means a lower minimum creepage distance required, and the closer two conductive parts can be. 

In design of medical products, the CTI is treated differently. Material groups are classified as shown below, per IEC 60601-1:2005, International Standard published by the International Electrotechnical Commission (IEC):

The test method does not work well for voltages below 125VAC as the solution does not evaporate between successive drops.  The test method has an upper limit of 600VAC; higher voltages result in air breakdown between the electrodes and not along the surface of the specimen under test. Other test methods should be sought if the objective is to differentiate specimens with CTI values above 600VAC.

References

External links 
 Underwriters Laboratory definition of CTI 
 IEC 60112 Method for the determination of the proof and the comparative tracking indices of solid insulating materials 
 IEC 60601-1 Medical electrical equipment - Part 1: General requirements for basic safety and essential performance 

Electrical breakdown
Units of measurement